İnpiri is a village in the Amasra District, Bartın Province, Turkey. Its population is 179 (2021).

History 
The name of the village is mentioned as İnköy in the records of 1907. The village has had the same name since 1928.

Geography 
The village is 21 km from Bartın city center and 6 km from Amasra town centre.

References

Villages in Amasra District